Tove Karoline Knutsen (born 14 January 1951 in Torsken) is a Norwegian politician for the Labour Party.

She was elected to the Norwegian Parliament from Troms in 2005.

She graduated as cand.philol. in 1982, and spent large parts of her career as a "freelance musician, composer and artist". She was a member of the board of the Norwegian Broadcasting Corporation 1992–1998, Arts Council Norway 2001-2004 and Nesna University College 2001–2005. She was instrumental in the 2014 Olympic bid for Tromsø, which ultimately failed.

Honors 
1984: Spellemannprisen in the category Folk music
1992: Nordlysprisen

References

1951 births
Living people
People from Torsken
Members of the Storting
Politicians from Tromsø
Labour Party (Norway) politicians
University of Tromsø alumni
University of Oslo alumni
Spellemannprisen winners
21st-century Norwegian politicians